Keratin, type II cuticular Hb6 is a protein that in humans is encoded by the KRT86 gene.

The protein encoded by this gene is a member of the keratin gene family. As a type II hair keratin, it is a basic protein which heterodimerizes with type I keratins to form hair and nails. The type II hair keratins are clustered in a region of chromosome 12q13 and are grouped into two distinct subfamilies based on structure similarity. One subfamily, consisting of KRTHB1, KRTHB3, and KRTHB6, is highly related. The other less-related subfamily includes KRTHB2, KRTHB4, and KRTHB5. All hair keratins are expressed in the hair follicle; this hair keratin, as well as KRTHB1 and KRTHB3, is found primarily in the hair cortex. Mutations in this gene and KRTHB1 have been observed in patients with a rare dominant hair disease, monilethrix.

References

Further reading